The 2020 Global Awards ceremony was held on Thursday 5 March 2020 at London's Eventim Apollo and was sponsored by very.co.uk. Roman Kemp and Myleene Klass returned to host the ceremony and were joined by Kate Garraway who replaced Rochelle Humes

Performances 
Performances and special appearances included Ellie Goulding, Stereophonics, Camila Cabello, Aitch, Tones and I, Aled Jones and Russell Watson.

Nominees and winners 
The list of nominees was announced in January 2020. Ed Sheeran and Lewis Capaldi were the most nominated male singers. The most nominated female singers were Dua Lipa and Camila Cabello.

Multiple awards and nominations
 Artists with the most nominations

 Artists that received multiple awards

References 

2020 music awards
British music awards
2020 awards in the United Kingdom